Louis Rogers "Red" Zontini (August 30, 1917 – August 6, 1986) was an American football fullback and halfback.

Zontini was born in Whitesville, West Virginia, in 1917 and attended Sherman High School in Seth, West Virginia. He played college football for Notre Dame from 1937 to 1939.

Zontini played professional football in the National Football League for the Chicago Cardinals from 1940 to 1941 and the Cleveland Rams in 1944 and in the All-America Football Conference for the Buffalo Bisons  in 1946.  He appeared in a total of 40 professional games, six of them as a starter. He tallied 133 rushing yards and 110 receiving yards and scored four touchdowns.  He also kicked nine field goals (out of 23 attempts) and 59 extra points (out of 64 attempts).

Zontini served in the Navy in 1945 and was a member of the undefeated 1945 Fleet City Bluejackets football team. 

He was hired as an assistant football coach at Western Reserve University in 1948. He was appointed as a full-time assistant coach in 1950.

He died in 1986 in Richmond Heights, Ohio and buried at All Souls Cemetery in Chardon, Ohio.

References

External links
 

1917 births
1986 deaths
American football fullbacks
American football halfbacks
Buffalo Bisons (AAFC) players
Case Western Spartans football coaches 
Notre Dame Fighting Irish football players
People from Boone County, West Virginia
Coaches of American football from West Virginia
Players of American football from West Virginia